David Mayburn Fry (born 19 November 1957) is an Australian former politician. Born in Manly, New South Wales, he moved to Tasmania and in 2000 was elected to the Tasmanian House of Assembly in a countback following the resignation of Bass MHA Frank Madill. A member of the Liberal Party, he served as party whip from 2001. In 2002, he was defeated by fellow Liberal Peter Gutwein. He ran again for Bass in 2006 but was unsuccessful.

References

1957 births
Living people
Liberal Party of Australia members of the Parliament of Tasmania
Members of the Tasmanian House of Assembly
People from Manly, New South Wales
21st-century Australian politicians